Norbert Gombos was the defending champion but lost in the first round to Corentin Moutet.

Moutet won the title after defeating Stefanos Tsitsipas 6–2, 7–6(10–8) in the final.

Seeds

Draw

Finals

Top half

Bottom half

References
Main Draw
Qualifying Draw

Brest Challenger - Singles